Herranen is a Finnish surname. Notable people with the surname include:

 Mikko Herranen (born 1976), Finnish multi-industrialist, singer/songwriter, recording engineer, and producer
 Kyle Herranen (born 1977), Canadian visual artist

Finnish-language surnames